African Americans constitute one of the longer-running ethnic presences in New York City, home to the largest urban African American population, and the world's largest Black population of any city outside Africa, by a significant margin.

Population

According to the 2010 Census, New York City had the largest population of black residents of any U.S. city, with over 2 million within the city's boundaries, although this number has decreased since 2000. New York City had more black people than did the entire state of California until the 1980 Census. The black community consists of immigrants and their descendants from Africa and the Caribbean as well as native-born African-Americans. Many of the city's black residents live in Brooklyn, Queens, Harlem, and The Bronx. Several of the city's neighborhoods are historical birthplaces of urban black culture in America, among them the Brooklyn neighborhood of Bedford–Stuyvesant and Manhattan's Harlem and various sections of Eastern Queens and The Bronx. Bedford-Stuyvesant is considered to have the highest concentration of black residents in the United States. New York City has the largest population of black immigrants (at 686,814) and descendants of immigrants from the Caribbean (especially from Jamaica, Trinidad and Tobago, Barbados, Guyana, Belize, Grenada, and Haiti), Latin America (Afro-Latinos), and of sub-Saharan Africans. African immigration is now driving the growth of the Black population in New York City.

History

After abolition
Following the final abolition of slavery in New York in 1827, New York City emerged as one of the largest pre-Civil War metropolitan concentrations of free African-Americans, and many institutions were established to advance the community in the antebellum period. It was the site of the first African-American periodical journal Freedom's Journal, which lasted for two years and renamed The Rights of All for a third year before fading to obsolescence; the newspaper served as both a powerful voice for the abolition lobby in the United States as well as a voice of information for the African population of New York City and other metropolitan areas. The African Dorcas Association was also established to provide educational and clothing aid to Black youth in the city.

However, New York residents were less willing to give blacks equal voting rights. By the constitution of 1777, voting was restricted to free men who could satisfy certain property requirements for value of real estate. This property requirement disfranchised poor men among both blacks and whites. The reformed Constitution of 1821 conditioned suffrage for black men by maintaining the property requirement, which most could not meet, so effectively disfranchised them. The same constitution eliminated the property requirement for white men and expanded their franchise. No women yet had the vote in New York. "As late as 1869, a majority of the state's voters cast ballots in favor of retaining property qualifications that kept New York's polls closed to many blacks. African-American men did not obtain equal voting rights in New York until ratification of the Fifteenth Amendment in 1870."

The emancipated African-Americans established communities in the New York City area, including Seneca Village in what is now Central Park of Manhattan and Sandy Ground on Staten Island, and Weeksville in Brooklyn. These communities were among the earliest.

The city was a nerve center for the abolitionist movement in the United States.

After the Civil War

Harlem and Great Migration

The violent rise of Jim Crow in the Deep and Upper South led to the mass migration of African Americans, including ex-slaves and their free-born children, from those regions to northern metropolitan areas, including New York City. Their mass arrival coincided with the transition of the center of African-American power and demography in the city from other districts of the city to Harlem.

The tipping point occurred on June 15, 1904, when up-and-coming real estate entrepreneur Philip A. Payton, Jr. established the Afro-American Realty Company, which began to aggressively buy and lease houses in the ethnically mixed but predominantly-white Harlem following the housing crashes of 1904 and 1905. In addition to an influx of long-time African-American residents from other neighborhoods, the Tenderloin, San Juan Hill (now the site of Lincoln Center), Little Africa around Minetta Lane in Greenwich Village and Hell's Kitchen in the west 40s and 50s. The move to northern Manhattan was driven in part by fears that anti-black riots such as those that had occurred in the Tenderloin in 1900 and in San Juan Hill in 1905 might recur. In addition, a number of tenements that had been occupied by blacks in the west 30s were destroyed at this time to make way for the construction of the original Penn Station.

Caribbean immigration

The Great Depression and demographic shift
Harlem's decline as the center of the Afro-American population in New York City began with the onset of the Great Depression in 1929. In the early 1930s, 25% of Harlemites were out of work, and employment prospects for Harlemites stayed bad for decades. Employment among black New Yorkers fell as some traditionally black businesses, including domestic service and some types of manual labor, were taken over by other ethnic groups. Major industries left New York City altogether, especially after 1950. Several riots happened in this period, including in 1935 and 1943. Following the construction of the IND Fulton Street Line in 1936, African Americans left an overcrowded Harlem for greater housing availability in Bedford–Stuyvesant. migrants from the American South brought the neighborhood's black population to around 30,000, making it the second largest Black community in the city at the time. During World War II, the Brooklyn Navy Yard attracted many blacks to the neighborhood as an opportunity for employment, while the relatively prosperous war economy enabled many of the resident Jews and Italians to move to Queens and Long Island. By 1950, the number of blacks in Bedford–Stuyvesant had risen to 155,000, comprising about 55 percent of the population of Bedford–Stuyvesant. In the 1950s, real estate agents and speculators employed blockbusting to turn a profit. As a result, formerly middle class white homes were being turned over to poorer black families. By 1960, eighty-five percent of the population was black.

African-Americans and the COVID-19 pandemic 

The COVID-19 pandemic has disproportionally affected African Americans, or Black Americans living inside the United States. Black Americans are more likely to contract COVID-19, more likely to be hospitalized, and more likely to die from COVID-19 than White, non-Hispanic Americans.  Many Black Americans work jobs without health insurance coverage, leading to an inability to seek proper medical care when faced with a severe COVID-19 case. Furthermore, Black Americans were overrepresented in jobs labeled essential when governments began reacting to the pandemic, such as grocery store workers, transit workers, and civil jobs. This meant Black Americans continued to work jobs that posed higher risk to exposure to COVID-19.

The unique combination of stressors faced by Black people in America under the COVID-19 Pandemic has put many Black social systems and crisis-meeting resources under stress. The Black Church has historically been a place of community support, recognition, and social connections for African-American communities, a community that provides access to the physical, emotional, and spiritual needs that many Black Americans face systematic difficulty in attaining. The policy of Social Distancing as recommended for the sake of public health in COVID-19 has contributed to the hardships faced by all humans, but has affected Black Americans and their social systems especially. Black Americans that live within the poor and underserviced neighborhoods rely on complex social and religious organizations, including the Black Church, to meet their physical and emotional needs. Social Distancing has led to an increased difficulty in maintaining these essential social relationships, resulting in increased social isolation throughout Black communities.

Within New York City, these issues are present or intensified. The COVID-19 Pandemic has revealed the long-standing systemic racism present throughout New York City's healthcare system, especially in terms of access to critical healthcare resources in underserviced, and often predominantly black communities. This inability to properly treat affected Black residents of certain New York City zip-codes is especially harsh when contrasted by the abundance of empty hospital beds and available resources of the hospitals in more affluent and well off communities. The racial inequality between zip codes is further highlighted when examining COVID-19 testing rates, where zip-codes of predominantly Black New Yorkers are at a significantly higher risk of testing positive for COVID-19. Of the ten zip codes in New York City with highest COVID-19 death rates, eight of them are Black or Hispanic.

Notable Black New Yorkers

18th and 19th-centuries

20th and 21st-centuries 

James Baldwin

Accomplishments

 Adam Clayton Powell Jr. - first person of African-American descent to be elected from New York to Congress; previously, first person of African-American descent to be elected to New York City Council
 Alonzo Smythe Yerby - first black chairman of a department at the public health school, and the first black to be New York City Hospitals Commissioner, heading the city's hospitals department, namesake of the Harvard Chan Yerby Fellowship Program at the Harvard T.H. Chan School of Public Health.
 Arthur Mitchell - First African-American male dancer in a major ballet company: (New York City Ballet); also first African-American principal dancer of a major ballet company (NYCB), 1956
 Brigette A. Bryant - first woman of African-American descent to serve as Vice Chancellor of the City University of New York
 David Dinkins - first African-American mayor of New York City (1990)
 Dr. James McCune Smith - First formally trained African-American Medical Doctor
 Letitia James - first woman of African-American descent to be elected to citywide office (New York City Public Advocate)
 Mary Pinkett, first woman of African-American descent to be elected to New York City Council
 Robert O. Lowery - First African-American fire commissioner of the New York City Fire Department and of any major U.S. City's fire department
 Samuel J. Battle - First African-American police officer in the New York Police Department following consolidation of the boroughs (1911). Also the NYPD's first African-American sergeant (1926), lieutenant (1935), and parole commissioner (1941).
 Shirley Chisholm - first black woman elected to the U.S. Congress and first black candidate, male or female, for a major party's nomination for President of the United States.
 Todd Duncan - first African-American member of the New York City Opera
 Wesley Augustus Williams - first African-American officer in the New York Fire Department
 William Grant Still's Troubled Island as performed by the New York City Opera - first black-composed opera to be performed by a major U.S. company
 Willie Overton - First African-American police officer in present-day New York City (1891)

See also 

Demographics of New York City
History of New York City
History of slavery in New York (state)
Afro-Caribbean people
Caribbean immigration to New York City
Medgar Evers College
Schomburg Center for Research in Black Culture
Black Jews in New York City
East Coast hip hop
Universal Hip Hop Parade
Puerto Ricans in New York City
Black Lives Matter protests in New York City
Black Lives Matter art in New York City
African American Day Parade
Little Africa, Manhattan
Land of the Blacks (Manhattan)
Syrian Americans in New York City
Belarusian Americans in New York City
Dutch Americans in New York City
Dominicans in New York City
Italians in New York City
Irish Americans in New York City
Chinese people in New York City
Filipinos in New York City
Japanese in New York City
Koreans in New York City
Russians in New York City
Ukrainian Americans in New York City
Jews in New York City

References

External links
History of Slavery in New York
Recovering New York’s Entangled Dutch, Native American, And African Histories: An Interview With Jennifer Tosch
Slaves in New Amsterdam
New York City's Slave Market
https://macaulay.cuny.edu/seminars/henken08/articles/t/h/e/The_History_of_Black_New_York_864f.html
https://virtualny.ashp.cuny.edu/EncyNYC/Blacks_for_draft_riots.html
 
 
New York City